Lou Malnati's Pizzeria is an American Chicago-style pizza restaurant chain headquartered in Northbrook, Illinois. It was founded by the son of Rudy Malnati, who was instrumental in developing the recipe for Chicago-style pizza, and it has become one of the Chicago area's best-known local lines of pizza restaurants. Lou Malnati's operates a division of its company called Lou Malnati's Presents Tastes of Chicago, a partnership with Portillo's Restaurants and Eli's Cheesecake, which ships Chicago-style cuisine nationally.

History
In the 1940s, Lou Malnati began working with his father, Rudy, making deep-dish pizza. In the 1950s, they co-managed Pizzeria Uno. Lou and his wife Jean opened the first Lou Malnati's Pizzeria on March 17, 1971, in Lincolnwood, Illinois.

The Lincolnwood restaurant was successful, and the family subsequently opened another restaurant in Elk Grove Village, Illinois. Initially a rocky start, the second restaurant proved profitable, and the company continued to grow. As of April 2016, Lou Malnati's owns and operates 57 restaurants in the Chicago metropolitan area.  The company participates in the Taste of Chicago and has been active in local charities. It has also been a decades-long sponsor of WGN Radio's programming, and its pizza is offered in multiple station contests as a prize.

After Lou Malnati died of cancer in 1978, his wife and sons Marc and Rick took over the business. Its main competitors include Pizzeria Uno, Giordano's Pizza and Gino's East. 

Lou's half-brother, Rudy Malnati Jr., opened another deep dish chain called Pizano's in 1991, which has five locations as of 2021; the recipe used at Pizano's was developed by Rudy Malnati's wife, Donna Marie.

On July 4, 2011, Lou Malnati's opened their biggest pizzeria in the Gold Coast neighborhood of Chicago. In July 2021, Lou Malnati's announced it was moving its headquarters to Buffalo Grove, Illinois.

Expansion beyond Illinois
Lou Malnati's has opened restaurants in three other states: Arizona (7), Indiana (5), and Wisconsin (5). Lou Malnati's began opening restaurants in the Phoenix area on May 12, 2016, with the first location opening at Uptown Plaza in central Phoenix. All locations in Arizona are in the Phoenix area. Indiana has four locations in the Indianapolis area, a fifth location is in Schererville, Indiana, which opened on July 15, 2019 and was the first Indiana opening. A store opened in Greenwood, Indiana on June 6, 2022. Schererville and Greenwood locations are exclusively carryout, delivery, and catering, offering no dine-in services. Wisconsin followed Indiana, with Lou Malnati's opening its first restaurant on December 11, 2019 in the Milwaukee suburb of Fox Point. The locations in Wisconsin are within the Milwaukee area.

Pizza style
Lou Malnati's is a prototypical Chicago style pizza, and its deep dish pizza is generally referred to as a "pie". A thin crust of pizza dough is laid in a seasoned deep-dish pizza pan and raised up on the sides. The ingredients are placed on a Chicago style deep-dish pizza in the opposite order of a thin crust pizza, with sausage lining the bottom layer instead of the pizza sauce. The first ingredients are thick slices of mozzarella cheese that are placed directly on the dough. Then, additional ingredients like mushrooms, pepperoni, and onions are spread on top of the cheese. The pizza is topped with a tomato sauce made with whole chunks of tomatoes. A "Lou-Mal" pie uses a "sausage patty", a single patty of Italian sausage below the layer of tomato chunks or sauce, as opposed to the more traditional crumbled sausage. The company has gluten-free pizzas available in small deep dish only; as well as a crust-less version where the dough is replaced with sausage. The total time to bake a deep dish is 30 minutes for carryout orders. If it is scheduled for delivery, it can take up to one hour, 30 minutes to bake it then a 30 minute window to deliver to customers.

Philanthropy 
Since 1971, the Malnati family has hosted an annual one-day charity event. Lou and Jean Malnati started the event as a scholarship fund for local athletes to Wake Forest University in the name of Brian Piccolo, and after Lou died of cancer in 1978, Jean carried on the annual tradition in Lou's name with the focus changing to raising money for cancer research.

In 1995, Lou Malnati's opened a restaurant in Chicago's west side neighborhood of Lawndale with the goal being to give all profits back to the community to benefit children's educational and recreational programs.  While partnering with the Lawndale Community Church, Lou Malnati's has also created a job-training program for residents of the church's recovery home, Hope House, to get them back in the working world.

See also

 List of pizza chains of the United States
 Will Malnati

References

External links

Lou Malnati's Tastes of Chicago

1971 establishments in Illinois
Italian restaurants in the United States
Pizza chains of the United States
Restaurants in Chicago
Regional restaurant chains in the United States
Restaurants established in 1971